Reverend Patrick Henderson is a gospel keyboard player, songwriter and producer. He has written several songs in collaboration with Michael McDonald, playing on a number of his and the Doobie Brothers albums. Henderson has long associations with many other artists as well, including Leon Russell, Michael Bolton, Nils Lofgren and Freddie King. He won a Gospel Music Association "Dove Award" for Best Contemporary Gospel Record Song of the Year in 1990.

Biography
Henderson contributed the story of how his hand was cut off by an insane fan to the 2006 book by David Ritz.

References

American performers of Christian music
Gospel music pianists
Living people
21st-century pianists
Year of birth missing (living people)